O'Neal Ricardo Marshall (born 25 August 1971) is a Barbadian windsurfer. He competed at the 1996 Summer Olympics and the 2000 Summer Olympics.

References

External links
 
 

1971 births
Living people
Barbadian male sailors (sport)
Barbadian windsurfers
Olympic sailors of Barbados
Sailors at the 1996 Summer Olympics – Mistral One Design
Sailors at the 2000 Summer Olympics – Mistral One Design
Place of birth missing (living people)